December 2015 tornado outbreak could refer to:

 Tornado outbreak of December 23–25, 2015
 Tornado outbreak of December 26–28, 2015, part of the December 2015 North American storm complex